Abraham Broman "Abe" Thompson (born January 12, 1982) is an American former soccer player.

Youth and college

Born in Tucson, Arizona, Thompson attended Wilbert Tucker Woodson High School in Virginia, and played college soccer at the University of Maryland from 2000 to 2005, where he appeared in 79 games scoring 43 goals and adding 26 assists. He was named a Hermann Trophy semifinalist in 2004 and 2005.

Thompson also played in the USL Premier Development League for Chesapeake Dragons and Boulder Rapids Reserve, and played club soccer for the Braddock Road Warhawks, with whom he won the 1999 Don Greer Cup and the 1999 US U-17 National Championship.

Professional career

Thompson was drafted in the second round, 16th overall, of the 2005 MLS Supplemental Draft by FC Dallas, and subsequently spent four years in Texas. He was traded to Kansas City Wizards on September 5, 2008, in exchange for allocation money.

Houston Dynamo acquired Thompson and allocation money from Kansas City in exchange for forward Kei Kamara. However, Thompson was waived at the end of the season and selected by Real Salt Lake in the resulting Waiver Draft. Thompson was waived by Real Salt Lake during the 2010 pre-season, without making an appearance for the club.

Thompson signed with USSF Division 2 club Miami FC on March 18, 2010. He re-signed with the club, now named Fort Lauderdale Strikers and playing in the North American Soccer League, on March 17, 2011.

Fort Lauderdale re-signed Thompson in February 2012 as both player and assistant coach. At the end of the season, Thompson retired from professional soccer.

References

External links
 

1982 births
Living people
American soccer players
Association football forwards
Chesapeake Dragons players
Colorado Rapids U-23 players
FC Dallas draft picks
FC Dallas players
Fort Lauderdale Strikers players
Houston Dynamo FC players
Major League Soccer players
Maryland Terrapins men's soccer players
Miami FC (2006) players
North American Soccer League players
People from Fairfax Station, Virginia
Soccer players from Arizona
Soccer players from Virginia
Sporting Kansas City players
United States men's youth international soccer players
USL League Two players
USSF Division 2 Professional League players
Wilbert Tucker Woodson High School alumni